Bob and Mike Bryan defeating Ivan Dodig and Marcelo Melo in the final, 6–7(5–7), 6–2, [10–7] to win the doubles tennis title at the 2014 ATP World Tour Finals. It was their fourth Tour Finals title.

David Marrero and Fernando Verdasco were the reigning champions, but did not qualify this year.

Seeds

Alternates

Draw

Finals

Group A

Group B
Standings are determined by: 1. number of wins; 2. number of matches; 3. in two-player ties, head-to-head records; 4. in three-player ties, percentage of sets won, or of games won; 5. steering-committee decision.

References

External Links
Main Draw

Doubles